The 1888 United States presidential election in Iowa took place on November 6, 1888, as part of the 1888 United States presidential election. Voters chose 13 representatives, or electors to the Electoral College, who voted for president and vice president.

Iowa voted for the Republican nominee, Benjamin Harrison, over the Democratic nominee, incumbent President Grover Cleveland. Harrison won the state by a margin of 7.85%.

Results

Results by county

See also
 United States presidential elections in Iowa

Notes

References

Iowa
1888
1888 Iowa elections